Onionz (born Andrew Venegas; 1970) is an American music producer, DJ, and musician. The native New Yorker is known for his many contributions to Electronic Music, and more specifically, his unique signature DJing style of blending House music and Techno sounds together. In 2002, he was nominated for Billboard Magazine’s Beat Box DanceStar USA Awards in the Best Breakthrough DJ category.
Onionz' earliest musical influence was his Brother Evan and father, Victor Venegas, who played upright bass alongside important Latin and Jazz musicians such as Mongo Santamaría, Celia Cruz, Nina Simone, and Harlem River Drive Band. By the age of ten, Onionz was an accomplished percussionist on his own, making regular stage appearances together with his father and other notable musicians including Candido, David Amram, Steve Berrios, and Paquito D'Rivera.

As a youth, Onionz gained further musical inspiration from David Mancuso (The Loft NYC creator), DJ/producer duo The Latin Rascals, and Red Alert. By mid-1982, Onionz began mixing together early styles of Hip hop, Breakbeat, and Disco records while DJing local NYC venues.

Over the last 30 years Onionz has toured and headlined premier dance music festivals and events throughout 44 states within the US and 35 countries abroad. Onionz has held residency at celebrated dance venues including Roxy NYC and Stereo Montreal, with regular appearances at Pacha Ibiza, The Sound Factory, Limelight NYC, Twilo, Webster Hall, Tunnel and Palladium (New York City).

Within the past 20 years, Onionz has contributed both original productions and remixes to numerous dance music labels including Intec Digital, Warner Music/Rhino Records, Om Records, Defected Records, Champion Records, and Ibadan Records. Additionally, he produced remixes for many influential dance music artists including Carl Cox, Robin S #1 hit "Show Me Love", Roy Ayers, Robert Owens, and Sandy B Billboard #1 "Make My World Go Round". In 1994, he founded the dance music record label Electrik Soul. Electrik Soul has put out music by Dubtribe, Dj Yousef, Joeski, Tony Senghore, Hipp-e, Fred Everything, ETI, Leo Young Eli Escobar, Shan Nicholson, Wally Callerio, Dj Who, Troy Dillard, Vitamin D, Halo,  and Master D.

Currently, Onionz remains an active force within the Electronic Music scene as he continues to tour and deliver his signature style of DJing to audiences throughout the United States and abroad. He has an established production catalog of 150+ original music tracks and remixes which continues to grow. Some of the most notable House and Techno DJ's of today regularly incorporate his music into their DJ sets.

During 2016 and 2017 Onionz wrote his first film score as Musical Director for the short Xing Film. Onionz lead and introduced the Xing Film team to the current world of Electronic Music by including incredible talent into his score with music by licenses by Slam, Frankie Bones, Carl Cox and Funk D Void. The film won its way to 18 film festivals and two awards including a screening at Festival de Cannes in France.

Discography

Original works
Onionz - Hot 4 U : 2016 Mixes - Household Digital
Onionz - SpaceSlave - Uniting Souls
Onionz - Buya - Blue Records
Onionz - Beautiful Music - NightChild Records
Onionz - Free Spirit - Blinded Records
Onionz - Need Ya, Tatti’s Groove - Intec Records
Onionz - Peel Pressure - Seamless Recordings
Onionz - The Touch E.P. - Mile End Records
Onionz - Begunnin - Electrik Soul Recordings
Onionz - Share The World - Digital Memory Music
Onionz - Summertime Saves Me - Electrik Soul Recordings
Onionz - Carmelized E.P. - Release Musiq 
Onionz - Badunkadunk EP - Nervous Records
Onionz - N.Y. Thunder - Mile End Records
Onionz - Fantasy Island - Electrik Soul Recordings
Onionz - 1+1=3 - Electrik Soul Recordings
Onionz - Old Shamanic Ritual - Electrik Soul Recordings
Onionz - Set U Free - Electrik Soul Recordings
Onionz - Burnt - Electrik Soul Recordings
Onionz - Dancing For The Dead - Endemic Recordings
Onionz - Liquid Salsa - Electrik Soul Recordings
Onionz - Space Bass - Endemic Recordings
Onionz - Sex And Drums Feat. Jake Childs - Stripped Recordings
Onionz - Road Warrior - Unrivaled Music
Onionz - Smoke Signals/ Big Popsicle - Cr2
Onionz - Nothin But Love - Toolroom Records
Onionz - Don't Slip Away - Hardplace Recordings
Onionz - Your Love - Forensic
Onionz - The Calling - Hardplace Recordings
Onionz - Woman Of The Sun - Om Records
Onionz - If I Only Had A Brain - Industry Recordings
Onionz - Burning - Cr2 Recordings
Onionz - Play Dat Song - 20/20 Vision
Onionz - Chief Rocka Hot For U - Household Recordings
Onionz + Nick Chatellan - Drama Moda - One Off Recordings
Onionz - Swing E.P. - Carioca
Onionz - Doin Damage E.P. - Dae Recordings
Onionz - Backyard Chronicles - Treehouse
Onionz - Drum Circle - Household
Onionz - Soul Ting - Viberent
Onionz - Hermanos Y Hermanas - Goanche
Onionz - Master D Holy Ghost Power - Electrik Soul Recordings
Onionz - The Brand E.P. - Playback
Onionz - Gettin Thru It - Mi Casa
Onionz + Joeski - Tattoo Sessions - Maya
Onionz + Tony + Master D - The Music - Detour
Onionz - Horns In My Cave - Detour
Onionz - Acid Chants - Mozee Musik
Blakkat + The Barrio Brothers - Understanding - Electrik Soul Recordings
Onionz - For These Who Know E.P. - Aztalan
Onionz + Tony - Summer - Tango
Onionz + Master D Electriksoul Brothers - Tango
Onionz + Master D - Silver Lightening - Electriksoul
Onionz - Latin Hustler - Siesta
Onionz + Joeski + Master D - Touch Me - Electriksoul
Onionz + Master D - 4Th Dimension Of Existence - Siesta
6400 Crew Pres. Onionz + Halo - I Need Ya - Electriksoul
Onionz + Joeski Pres. Barrio Bros. - Hold On To Your Love - Electriksoul
Onionz + Joeski + Master D - Chango Musik - Electriksoul
Onionz - Groove Predator - Camouflage
Onionz + Master D + Tony - Right There - Electriksoul
6400 Crew Pres. Onionz + Tony - Cookin Up The Funk E.P. - Siesta
Onionz + Tony - How's Ya Vibe - Shaboom
Onionz + Master D - Celia's Groove - N.R.K.
Onionz + Master D - T's Tango Electriksoul
Onionz + Tony - Slightly Touched E.P. - Moody
Onionz + Tony + Dano - Extreme Measures - Moody
Onionz + Tony + Master D - Dano Brothers - Hand Low Pressing
Onionz + Master D - Fading Memories - Doubledown Recordings
19Th Street Brothers - The Park E.P. - Electriksoul
Dj Who + Onionz - Unlock Your Heart - Electriksoul
Onionz + Master D - Infatuation Imperial Dub
Onionz + Master D - Never Ending Journey - Electriksoul
Onionz - E.T.I. Supreme Soul Team - Electriksoul
Family - Say A Little Prayer - Electriksoul

Remixes

Phuture - We Are Phuture (Onionz Remix) – Afro Acid
Carl Cox - The Player (Onionz Remix) - Bush Records
Nathan Barato - Dirty (Onionz Remix) - Root And Wings Music
Halo Varga - Future (Onionz Remix) - Siesta Records
Marc Pollen - Risky Life (Onionz Remix) - Siesta Records
Alex Clavijo + Roger Arias - Ganguro - (Onionz Remix) - Uniform Recordings
Soup A - Passion - Sullivan Room Records
EMan + Doc Link - Hollow (Onionz Love Beth to Death Mix) - Liberate Recordings
Dj Pierre - Masterblaster (Turn It Up) (Onionz Remix) - Bush Records 
Phonolulu - Nights Young (Onionz Remix) - BluFin 
Timo Garcia - Wonderlust Bug (Onionz Remix) - Berwick Street Records
Ostrich - Go Down (Onionz Remix) - Mile End Records
Jack Loves Robots - Anxsociety (Onionz Remix) - Silent Machine Recordings
Joeski - Don't Stop (Onionz Remix) - Maya 
Jake Knights - Drench (Onionz Remix) - Influential House
Negghead - Life (Onionz Remix) - Waxon Records
Slok - Deesgustocosmicow (Onionz Remix) - Electronic Petz
Nick + Danny Chatelain - Katrinyla (Onionz Remix) - Goanche
Miss Honey Dijon Feat. Celeda - New Day (Onionz Chief Rocka Mix) - Mile End Records
Dbr + David Ferrara Vs. Blaze - My Beat (Onionz Remix) - Play This! Records
Timo Garcia - Boom (Onionz Remix) - Berwick St.
Harada - I Came (Onionz Remix) - Blu Fin
Cybersutra - I Believe (Onionz Remix) - Red Stick
Levi - Another You (Onionz Remix) - Dirty Fabric
Funk D Void - Genibra (Onionz Remix) - Soma
The Idiotbox - Supermodel (Onionz Remix) - Dirty Fabric
Jamie Anderson - Sunlight (Onionz Remix) - Om Records
Mattheson - Blown (Onionz Remix) - Atlantic Standard Recordings
Matt Rock - Night After Night (Onionz Remix) - Hardplace
Refined.se - Swinging Kitten (Onionz Dub) - Frik:N:Frak
Hawke - We Come From Far (Onionz Off The Radar Dub) - Eighth Dimension
Rock N Hardplace - Night After Night (Onionz Remix) - Hardplace Recordings
Drum Bums - The Idea (Onionz Dub) - Phonetic Recordings
Blacksoul Feat. Rithma - Not Another Love Song (Onionz Remix) - Blacksoul Music
Buick Project - Luminare (Onionz Rub) - Saved Records
Dennis Ferrer - Sandcastles (Onionz Remix) - Defected
Noel Nanton - Mongo Bongo (Onionz Remix) - N.R.K.
Lee Cabrera - Shake It (Onionz + Master D Remix) - Credence
Master H - Cest La Vie (Onionz Remix ) - Soma Recordings
Technique - When There Is Love (Onionz Remix) - Downtown 161
The Operator - (Onionz + Master D Remix) - Skyline Records
Blakkat Feat. Tyra - Rite Place (Onionz Remix) - Shaboom
Taka Boom - Groove Like That (Onionz Remix) - Shaboom
Chris Simmonds - In My Soul (Onionz Remix) - Big Chief
Rocket - People (Onionz + Master D's Doggy Style Dub) - Grayhound Recordings
Kerri Chandler Feat. Roy Ayers - Good Vibrations (Onionz Remix) - Champion
Sandy B - Make My World Go Round (Onionz Remix) - Champion
Robin S. - Show Me Love (Onionz Remix) - Champion
Raze - Break For Love (Onionz Remix) - Champion
Earth People - Dance (Onionz Remix) - Champion
Dano - The Crawl (Onionz + Master D Remix) - Red Melon
Halo - Mi Casa (Onionz + Master D Remix) - Moody
Soulstice - Lovely (Onionz + Master D Remix) - Om Records
Mephisto Odyssey - The Lift (Onionz + Tony Remix) - Primal/Warner Bros. 
Dj Shorty - In Your Mind (Onionz + Master D Electrik Soul Brothers Mix) - ESP-SUN Records
Felli + Buddy Exploding Fist (Onionz +Master D Remix) - Caffeine

References

External links

Electrik Soul
Victor Venegas

1970 births
American DJs
Musicians from New York (state)
Living people
Club DJs
American house musicians
American electronic musicians
Electronic dance music DJs